Miller City is an unincorporated community in Alexander County, Illinois, United States. Miller City is located by the southwest corner of Horseshoe Lake.

Education
It is in the Cairo School District.

References

Unincorporated communities in Alexander County, Illinois
Unincorporated communities in Illinois
Cape Girardeau–Jackson metropolitan area
Illinois populated places on the Mississippi River